Slush is a slurry mixture of liquid and solid forms of water.

Slush may also refer to:
 Slush (album), the experimental 1997 album by the band OP8
 Slush (event), a startup conference in Northern Europe
 Slush casting, a metal casting process
 Slush flow, type of snow avalanche
 Slush fund, an auxiliary monetary account or a reserve fund
 Slush hydrogen, a combination of liquid hydrogen and solid hydrogen
 Slush pile, unsolicited manuscripts
 Slush powder, polymers that can absorb large amounts of a liquid
 Slushy, also known as a Slush, a blended ice drink, with sugar, fruit, and/or other flavorings

See also
 Slush pump (disambiguation)
 Slosh